The Terror Wheel is the second EP by American hip hop group Insane Clown Posse, released on August 5, 1994 by Psychopathic Records. It is the second "sideshow" entry in the group's Dark Carnival saga. The EP contains six studio tracks. "The Dead Body Man" which was subsequently re-released in 1995 on Insane Clown Posse's third studio album Riddle Box, in a slightly higher key. "The Dead Body Man" received significant local radio play in Detroit following the release of The Terror Wheel. The song "The Smog" was originally known as "The Swarm", and was about a deadly swarm of insects. "The Smog" was also intended to be released on Riddle Box. The final track on the album contained a number you could call to find out the name of the next Joker's Card, Riddle Box. The cover of the album is from the Moby single, Go

Track listing

Personnel
 Violent J – vocals
 Shaggy 2 Dope – vocals, turntables
 Mike E. Clark – turntables, production
 Willaby Rags – guest vocals

References

1994 EPs
Albums produced by Mike E. Clark
Self-released albums
Insane Clown Posse EPs
Psychopathic Records EPs